"I'm the Trend" (stylized as "i'M THE TREND")  is a song recorded by South Korean girl group (G)I-dle dedicated for their fans, Neverland. It was released as a digital single on July 7, 2020 by Cube Entertainment. The single is composed by members Minnie and Yuqi, Yuto of Pentagon and FCM Houdini. The song was unveiled during their first online concert I-Land: Who Am I on July 5, 2020. An accompanying special clip for the song was uploaded onto (G)I-dle's YouTube channel simultaneously with the single's release.

The song is included in their first single album Dumdi Dumdi, released on August 3, 2020.

Background and release
The song was first teased by Cube with photos of (G)I-dle's song title as stickers with the phrase "Coming soon-!" starting June 28 and ended on July 2, leaving fans questioned whether it is a Japanese version of the songs. Later, on July 5, Cube revealed the artwork teaser image of the digital single with logo stickers such as 'Latata', 'Senorita', 'Uh-Oh', 'Lion' and 'Oh my god'.

"I'm the Trend" is Minnie's first self-written song in about a year after the release of "Blow Your Mind" in February 2018 and their Japanese single "For You" from the Japanese debut album Latata in July 2019. Additionally, this release marks Yuqi's first contribution in writing, producing and composing in the group's discography.

Composition and lyrics
"I'm the Trend" is a Latin music-based dance song that boasts an exciting rhythm, features lyrics that reference their other hit songs as points such as "Oh My God", "Blow Your Mind", "Latata", "Lion", "Maze", "Uh-Oh" and "Senorita". It is composed in the key of B minor, with a tempo of 145 BPM running three minutes and twenty-five seconds.

Promotion and critical reception
"I'm the Trend" was first performed as an encore at their first solo concert, I-Land: Who Am I.

A special clip and lyric video was released on July 7, 2020.

Rania Aniftos from Billboard described the song as "infectious spunky tune".

Commercial performance
The song debuted at number 96 on South Korea's Gaon Digital Chart with Gaon index of 4,608,218 on the chart issue dated July 5–11, 2020. It also debuted at number 14 and 122 on Download Chart and Streaming Chart, respectively. The track surpassed 1.8 million-plus Spotify streams and 1.8 million YouTube views as their monthly listeners eclipsed 3.5 million on Spotify.

Track listing

Accolades

Personnel
Credits are adapted from Melon.
 (G)I-dle – vocals
  Minnie - producing, songwriting, chorus
  Yuqi - producing, songwriting
  Soyeon - songwriting
 Yuto of Pentagon - producing, record engineering, drum programming
 FCM Houdini - producing, record engineering, guitar, drum programming, piano
 FCM 667 - bass
 Jeon Yeon  – record engineering, Recording
 Mr. Cho  – mixed
 Kwon Nam-woo  – mastering

Charts

Weekly charts

Release history

References

External links

2020 songs
2020 singles
(G)I-dle songs
Cube Entertainment singles
Korean-language songs
Songs written by Jeon So-yeon
Songs written by Minnie (singer)
Songs written by Song Yuqi